The 1989 555 Asian Open was a professional ranking snooker tournament that took place in August 1989 in Bangkok, Thailand.

Stephen Hendry won the tournament by defeating James Wattana 9–6 in the final.


Main draw

References

Asian Open
Sport in Thailand
Asian Open